Jung Kyung-ho (born August 31, 1983) is a South Korean actor. He became well known for his supporting roles in I'm Sorry, I Love You (2004) and Time Between Dog and Wolf (2007), and his leading roles in Smile, You (2009) and Heartless City (2013). He has since had leading roles in Beating Again (2015), One More Happy Ending (2016), Missing Nine (2017), Prison Playbook (2017–2018), Life on Mars (2018), When the Devil Calls Your Name (2019), Hospital Playlist (2020–21) and Crash Course in Romance (2023).

Early life
Jung Eul-young was initially against his son's desire to pursue acting, but Jung defied his father's wishes and moved out of the family home. Father and son did not speak for three years before finally reconciling.

Jung applied for and got accepted in the theater department of Chung-Ang University. During his freshman year, he became roommates with an older theater major named Ha Jung-woo. Ha became a huge influence in Jung's life, and Jung later said he decided to become an actor after seeing Ha perform onstage. It was Ha who persuaded Jung to try out for the KBS actors' audition in 2003.

Career

Early Career and breakthrough 
Jung passed the KBS audition, and was soon signed by leading talent agency SidusHQ. Along with four other newcomers from the agency, he made his acting debut in 5 Stars, a mobile drama produced by SidusHQ and broadcast over SK Telecom. A few minor roles on KBS followed.

Jung's first major break came in 2004 melodrama series I'm Sorry, I Love You, playing the supporting role of an actor who belatedly falls for his childhood friend (Im Soo-jung) and has an unusually close relationship with his mother. It was a critical and commercial hit, which led to his being cast in two films in 2005: he played the pop singer crush of a novice nun (Yoon Jin-seo) in the ensemble romantic comedy All for Love, and the more proactive assistant of a shy photographer (Kim Joo-hyuk) in When Romance Meets Destiny.

After playing his first leading role in the little-seen Gangster High (2006), Jung returned to television in the well-received action drama Time Between Dog and Wolf (2007), in which he and Lee Joon-gi played NIS agents. Back on the big screen, his turn as a policeman who unknowingly becomes interested in an autistic young woman (Kang Hye-jung) in Herb netted him a Best New Actor award at the Chunsa Film Art Awards. Jung then played a 1980s-era college student tutoring a high school girl (Cha Soo-yeon) in surreal romance For Eternal Hearts, the opening film of the 2007 Puchon International Fantastic Film Festival.

Director Lee Joon-ik then cast Jung in Sunny (2008) as a double bassist in a "consolatory band" who helps the heroine (Soo Ae) find her husband during the Vietnam War. The year after, he played a fugitive who faces off against a small town detective (Kim Yoon-seok) in Running Turtle (2009).

For his first role in a historical drama, Jung played a Goguryeo prince torn between love and duty in Ja Myung Go (2009), based on the folktale Prince Hodong and the Princess of Nakrang (Princess Jamyung was played by Jung Ryeo-won). After Ja Myung Go'''s lackluster ratings, Jung bounced back with popular family drama Smile, You, in which he and Lee Min-jung stars as a couple from different backgrounds. Of playing an endearing "beta male," Jung said, "I am glad to be able to play a fun character and work on a fun script."

After that, Jung chose the low-key The Great Gye Choon-bin (2010), a one-act Drama Special episode where he played an art therapist who meets a quirky kindergarten teacher who helps him get over his fear of the dark.

 Post Army Projects (2013-2016) 
Cable series Heartless City (2013) was Jung's first acting project post-army, a noir crime drama. He received the best reviews of his career yet for playing the dark, conflicted antihero.

He next starred as an arrogant Hallyu star on a rough flight from Tokyo to Seoul in the comedy Rollercoaster (released internationally as Fasten Your Seatbelt). It was the directorial debut of actor Ha Jung-woo, Jung's friend and fellow college alumni/agency mate in Fantagio. 

In 2014, he appeared in the 1970s-set period drama Endless Love, followed by the role of a psychopathic serial killer in Manhole. Jung next starred in Beating Again, a romantic drama about cellular memory after a heart transplant.

In 2016, he starred in the romantic comedy series One More Happy Ending. Jung played a single father who worked as reporter-photographer of gossip magazine "Masspunch", Song Soo-hyuk, love interest of main lead Han Mi-mo, acted by Jang Na-ra.

 Wise Series and other projects (2017-2020) 
In 2017, Jung starred in disaster drama Missing Nine, followed by the critically acclaimed Shin Won-ho's black comedy series Prison Playbook. Jung acted as Lee Joon-ho, an elite prison guard and Je-hyuk's best friend. He used to play baseball with Je-hyuk in high school but had to quit because of injuries sustained in a car accident. Other prisoners and guards believe that he is just an avid fan of Kim Je-hyuk. The series was a commercial hit and became one of the highest rated Korean series on cable television history.

In 2018, Jung was cast as the lead role in Korean remake of British crime drama Life on Mars. Directed by Lee Jung-hyo, the series received acclaim from viewers, and Jung was praised for his convincing portrayal of a dazed detective.

In 2019, Jung starred in the occult melodrama When the Devil Calls Your Name. Jung acted as Ha Rip (Seo Dong-cheon), a star composer who has sold his soul to a titular devil. He has enjoyed youth and success with numerous hits to his name. In December, Jung was making a special appearance in drama Crash Landing on You as the ex-boyfriend of Yoon Se-ri (Son Ye-jin). His appearance was made possible by his connection with production director Lee Jung-hyo.

In 2020, Jung reunited with director Shin Won-ho in hit and critically acclaimed medical drama Hospital Playlist as Kim Jun-wan, an associate professor of cardiothoracic surgery who became chief of the CS department later on. He has a relationship with Ik-jun's younger sister, Ik-sun (played by Kwak Sun-young). He reprised his role in season 2 in 2021.

On August 24, 2021, it was announced that Jung, Jo Jung-suk, Jeon Mi-do, Yoo Yeon-seok, and Kim Dae-myung will start filming Na Yeong-seok's new variety show in Gangwon-do on September 6th.

 Theater Debut and recent works (2021-present) 
In 2021, Jung challenged himself with his first theater play. He was cast as Prior Walter in Korean premiere of award winning Tony Kershler's play Angels in America. The National Theater Company of Korea's premiere of Angels in America - Part One: The Millennium Approaches was held from November 26th to December 26th at the Myeongdong Arts Theater. He reprised his role as Prior Walter in The National Theater Company of Korea's premiere of Angels in America - Part Two: Perestroika. His performance gained critical recognition and nomination for Best Actor in Theater in 2022 Baeksang Arts Award.

In 2022, Jung returned to the big screen with The Great Dancer. and Men of Plastic.

He then starred alongside Jeon Do-yeon in Yoo Je-won's romantic-comedy drama Crash Course in Romance which premiered on tvN in January 2023. According to Good Data Corporation, series Crash Course in Romance'' ranked first with a topical share of 23.8% in Top 10 of TV Topicality Ranking in drama division category in four weeks in a row. Jung Kyung-ho ranked first in the performer category for five consecutive weeks.

Personal life
In April 2008, he and actor Yoo Ha-jun became business partners and launched the internet shopping mall Double Bill, which sold vintage and trendy clothes for men.

Military service 
Jung enlisted on November 30, 2010, to serve his mandatory military service as an active-duty soldier with the 306th draft. He was later transferred to the military band in Yongin, then discharged on September 4, 2012, with a commendation from the Army Chief of Staff.

Relationship 
Jung Kyung-ho's agency confirmed in January 2014 that Jung has been dating actress and singer Choi Soo-young of Girls' Generation since early 2013. The couple became closer after attending the same university and church.

Filmography

Film

Television series

Variety show

Music video

Theater

Discography

Awards and nominations

Notes

References

External links 
 
 

South Korean male television actors
South Korean male film actors
Chung-Ang University alumni
1983 births
Living people
21st-century South Korean male actors